Computer hardware includes the physical parts of a computer, such as the case, central processing unit (CPU), random access memory (RAM), monitor, mouse, keyboard, computer data storage, graphics card, sound card, speakers and motherboard.

By contrast, software is the set of instructions that can be stored and run by hardware. Hardware is so-termed because it is "hard" or rigid with respect to changes, whereas software is "soft" because it is easy to change.

Hardware is typically directed by the software to execute any command or instruction. A combination of hardware and software forms a usable computing system, although other systems exist with only hardware.

Von Neumann architecture

The template for all modern computers is the Von Neumann architecture, detailed in a 1945 paper by Hungarian mathematician John von Neumann. This describes a design architecture for an electronic digital computer with subdivisions of a processing unit consisting of an arithmetic logic unit and processor registers, a control unit containing an instruction register and program counter, a memory to store both data and instructions, external mass storage, and input and output mechanisms. The meaning of the term has evolved to mean a stored-program computer in which an instruction fetch and a data operation cannot occur at the same time because they share a common bus. This is referred to as the Von Neumann bottleneck and often limits the performance of the system.

Types of computer systems

Personal computer

The personal computer is one of the most common types of computer due to its versatility and relatively low price. Desktop personal computers have  a monitor, a keyboard, a mouse, and a computer case. The computer case holds the motherboard, fixed or removable disk drives for data storage, the power supply, and may contain other peripheral devices such as modems or network interfaces.  Some models of desktop computers integrated the monitor and keyboard into the same case as the processor and power supply. Separating the elements allows the user to arrange the components in a pleasing, comfortable array, at the cost of managing power and data cables between them.

Laptops are designed for portability but operate similarly to desktop PCs. They may use lower-power or reduced size components, with lower performance than a similarly priced desktop computer. Laptops contain the keyboard, display, and processor in one case. The monitor in the folding upper cover of the case can be closed for transportation, to protect the screen and keyboard.  Instead of a mouse, laptops may have a touchpad or pointing stick.

Tablets are portable computers that use a touch screen as the primary input device. Tablets generally weigh less and are smaller than laptops.

Some tablets include fold-out keyboards, or offer connections to separate external keyboards. Some models of laptop computers have a detachable keyboard, which allows the system to be configured as a touch-screen tablet. They are sometimes called "2-in-1 detachable laptops" or "tablet-laptop hybrids".

Case

The computer case encloses most of the components of the system. It provides mechanical support and protection for internal elements such as the motherboard, disk drives, and power supplies, and controls and directs the flow of cooling air over internal components. The case is also part of the system to control electromagnetic interference radiated by the computer and protects internal parts from electrostatic discharge. Large tower cases provide space for multiple disk drives or other peripherals and usually stand on the floor, while desktop cases provide less expansion room. All-in-one style designs include a video display built into the same case. Portable and laptop computers require cases that provide impact protection for the unit. Hobbyists may decorate the cases with colored lights, paint, or other features, in an activity called case modding.

Power supply

A power supply unit (PSU) converts alternating current (AC) electric power to low-voltage direct current (DC) power for the computer. Laptops can run on built-in rechargeable battery. The PSU typically uses a switched-mode power supply (SMPS), with power MOSFETs (power metal–oxide–semiconductor field-effect transistors) used in the converters and regulator circuits of the SMPS.

Motherboard

The motherboard is the main component of a computer. It is a board with integrated circuitry that connects the other parts of the computer including the CPU, the RAM, the disk drives (CD, DVD, hard disk, or any others) as well as any peripherals connected via the ports or the expansion slots. The integrated circuit (IC) chips in a computer typically contain billions of tiny metal–oxide–semiconductor field-effect transistors (MOSFETs).

Components directly attached to or to part of the motherboard include:
 The CPU (central processing unit), which performs most of the calculations which enable a computer to function, and is referred to as the brain of the computer.  It takes program instructions from random-access memory (RAM), interprets and processes them and then sends back results so that the relevant components can carry out the instructions. The CPU is a microprocessor, which is fabricated on a metal–oxide–semiconductor (MOS) integrated circuit (IC) chip. It is usually cooled by a heatsink and fan, or water-cooling system. Many newer CPUs include an on-die graphics processing unit (GPU). The clock speed of the CPU governs how fast it executes instructions and is measured in GHz; typical values lie between 1 GHz and 5 GHz. Many modern computers have the option to overclock the CPU which enhances performance at the expense of greater thermal output and thus a need for improved cooling.
 The chipset, which includes the north bridge, mediates communication between the CPU and the other components of the system, including main memory; as well as south bridge, which is connected to the north bridge, and supports auxiliary interfaces and buses; and, finally, a Super I/O chip, connected through the south bridge, which supports the slowest and most legacy components like serial ports, hardware monitoring and fan control.
Random-access memory (RAM), which stores the code and data that are being actively accessed by the CPU. For example, when a web browser is opened on the computer it takes up memory; this is stored in the RAM until the web browser is closed. It is typically a type of dynamic RAM (DRAM), such as synchronous DRAM (SDRAM), where MOS memory chips store data on memory cells consisting of MOSFETs and MOS capacitors. RAM usually comes on dual in-line memory modules (DIMMs) in the sizes of 2GB, 4GB, and 8GB, but can be much larger.
Read-only memory (ROM), which stores the BIOS that runs when the computer is powered on or otherwise begins execution, a process known as Bootstrapping, or "booting" or "booting up". The ROM is typically a nonvolatile BIOS memory chip, which stores data on floating-gate MOSFET memory cells.
 The BIOS (Basic Input Output System) includes boot firmware and power management firmware. Newer motherboards use Unified Extensible Firmware Interface (UEFI) instead of BIOS.
Buses that connect the CPU to various internal components and to expand cards for graphics and sound.
 The CMOS (complementary MOS) battery, which powers the CMOS memory for date and time in the BIOS chip. This battery is generally a watch battery.
 The video card (also known as the graphics card), which processes computer graphics. More powerful graphics cards are better suited to handle strenuous tasks, such as playing intensive video games or running computer graphics software. A video card contains a graphics processing unit (GPU) and video memory (typically a type of SDRAM), both fabricated on MOS integrated circuit (MOS IC) chips.
Power MOSFETs make up the voltage regulator module (VRM), which controls how much voltage other hardware components receive.

Expansion cards

An expansion card in computing is a printed circuit board that can be inserted into an expansion slot of a computer motherboard or backplane to add functionality to a computer system via the expansion bus. Expansion cards can be used to obtain or expand on features not offered by the motherboard.

Storage devices

A storage device is any computing hardware and digital media that is used for storing, porting and extracting data files and objects. It can hold and store information both temporarily and permanently and can be internal or external to a computer, server or any similar computing device. Data storage is a core function and fundamental component of computers. Dedicated storage devices include RAIDs and tape libraries.

Fixed media
Data is stored by a computer using a variety of media. Hard disk drives (HDDs) are found in virtually all older computers, due to their high capacity and low cost, but solid-state drives (SSDs) are faster and more power efficient, although currently more expensive than hard drives in terms of dollar per gigabyte, so are often found in personal computers built post-2007. SSDs use flash memory, which stores data on MOS memory chips consisting of floating-gate MOSFET memory cells. Some systems may use a disk array controller for greater performance or reliability.

Removable media
To transfer data between computers, an external flash memory device (such as a memory card or USB flash drive) or optical disc (such as a CD-ROM, DVD-ROM or BD-ROM) may be used. Their usefulness depends on being readable by other systems; the majority of machines have an optical disk drive (ODD), and virtually all have at least one Universal Serial Bus (USB) port. Additionally, USB sticks are typically pre-formatted with the FAT32 file system, which is widely supported across operating systems.

Input and output peripherals

Input and output devices are typically housed externally to the main computer chassis. The following are either standard or very common to many computer systems.

Input device
Input devices allow the user to enter information into the system, or control its operation. Most personal computers have a mouse and keyboard, but laptop systems typically use a touchpad instead of a mouse. Other input devices include webcams, microphones, joysticks, and image scanners.

Output device
Output devices are designed around the senses of human beings. For example, monitors display text that can be read, speakers produce sound that can be heard. Such devices also could include printers or a Braille embosser.

Mainframe computer

A mainframe computer is a much larger computer that typically fills a room and may cost many hundreds or thousands of times as much as a personal computer. They are designed to perform large numbers of calculations for governments and large enterprises.

Departmental computing

In the 1960s and 1970s, more and more departments started to use cheaper and dedicated systems for specific purposes like process control and laboratory automation. A minicomputer, or colloquially mini, is a class of smaller computers that was developed in the mid-1960s and sold for much less than mainframe and mid-size computers from IBM and its direct competitors.

Supercomputer

A supercomputer is superficially similar to a mainframe but is instead intended for extremely demanding computational tasks. , the fastest supercomputer on the TOP500 supercomputer list is Fugaku, in Japan, with a LINPACK benchmark score of 415 PFLOPS, superseding the second fastest, Summit, in the United States, by around 294 PFLOPS.

The term supercomputer does not refer to a specific technology. Rather it indicates the fastest computations available at any given time. In mid-2011, the fastest supercomputers boasted speeds exceeding one petaflop, or 1 quadrillion (10^15 or 1,000 trillion) floating-point operations per second.
Supercomputers are fast but extremely costly, so they are generally used by large organizations to execute computationally demanding tasks involving large data sets. Supercomputers typically run military and scientific applications. Although costly, they are also being used for commercial applications where huge amounts of data must be analyzed. For example, large banks employ supercomputers to calculate the risks and returns of various investment strategies, and healthcare organizations use them to analyze giant databases of patient data to determine optimal treatments for various diseases and problems incurring to the country.

Hardware upgrade
When using computer hardware, an upgrade means adding new or additional hardware to a computer that improves its performance, increases its capacity, or adds new features. For example, a user could perform a hardware upgrade to replace the hard drive with a faster one or a Solid State Drive (SSD) to get a boost in performance. The user may also install more Random Access Memory (RAM) so the computer can store additional temporary data, or retrieve such data at a faster rate. The user may add a USB 3.0 expansion card to fully use USB 3.0 devices, or could upgrade the Graphics Processing Unit (GPU) for cleaner, more advanced graphics, or more monitors. Performing such hardware upgrades may be necessary for aged computers to meet a new, or updated program's system requirements.

In large organizations, hardware upgrades are handled by administrators who are also in charge of keeping networks running smoothly. They replace network devices like servers, routers and storage devices based on new demands and capacities.

Sales
Global revenue from computer hardware in 2023 reached $705.17 billion dollars

Recycling

Because computer parts contain hazardous materials, there is a growing movement to recycle old and outdated parts. Computer hardware contain dangerous chemicals such as lead, mercury, nickel, and cadmium. According to the EPA these e-wastes have a harmful effect on the environment unless they are disposed of properly. Making hardware requires energy, and recycling parts will reduce air pollution, water pollution, as well as greenhouse gas emissions. Disposing unauthorized computer equipment is in fact illegal. Legislation makes it mandatory to recycle computers through the government approved facilities. Recycling a computer can be made easier by taking out certain reusable parts. For example, the RAM, DVD drive, the graphics card, hard drive or SSD, and other similar removable parts can be reused.

Many materials used in computer hardware can be recovered by recycling for use in future production. Reuse of tin, silicon, iron, aluminium, and a variety of plastics that are present in bulk in computers or other electronics can reduce the costs of constructing new systems. Components frequently contain copper, gold, tantalum, silver, platinum, palladium, and lead as well as other valuable materials suitable for reclamation.

Toxic computer components
The central processing unit contains many toxic materials. It contains lead and chromium in the metal plates. Resistors, semi-conductors, infrared detectors, stabilizers, cables, and wires contain cadmium. The circuit boards in a computer contain mercury, and chromium. When these types of materials, and chemicals are disposed improperly will become hazardous for the environment.

Environmental effects

According to the United States Environmental Protection Agency only around 15% of the e-waste actually is recycled. When e-waste byproducts leach into groundwater, are burned, or get mishandled during recycling, it causes harm. Health problems associated with such toxins include impaired mental development, cancer, and damage to the lungs, liver, and kidneys. That's why even wires have to be recycled. Different companies have different techniques to recycle a wire. The most popular one is the grinder that separates the copper wires from the plastic/rubber casing. When the processes are done there are two different piles left; one containing the copper powder, and the other containing plastic/rubber pieces. Computer monitors, mice, and keyboards all have a similar way of being recycled. For example, first, each of the parts are taken apart then all of the inner parts get separated and placed into its own bin.

Computer components contain many toxic substances, like dioxins, polychlorinated biphenyls (PCBs), cadmium, chromium, radioactive isotopes and mercury. Circuit boards contain considerable quantities of lead-tin solders that are more likely to leach into groundwater or create air pollution due to incineration. In US landfills, about 40% of the lead content levels are from e-waste. The processing (e.g. incineration and acid treatments) required to reclaim these precious substances may release, generate, or synthesize toxic byproducts.

Recycling of computer hardware is considered environmentally friendly because it prevents hazardous waste, including heavy metals and carcinogens, from entering the atmosphere, landfill or waterways. While electronics consist a small fraction of total waste generated, they are far more dangerous. There is stringent legislation designed to enforce and encourage the sustainable disposal of appliances, the most notable being the Waste Electrical and Electronic Equipment Directive of the European Union and the United States National Computer Recycling Act.

Efforts for minimizing computer hardware waste
As computer hardware contain a wide number of metals inside, the United States Environmental Protection Agency (EPA) encourages the collection and recycling of computer hardware. "E-cycling", the recycling of computer hardware, refers to the donation, reuse, shredding and general collection of used electronics. Generically, the term refers to the process of collecting, brokering, disassembling, repairing and recycling the components or metals contained in used or discarded electronic equipment, otherwise known as electronic waste (e-waste). "E-cyclable" items include, but are not limited to: televisions, computers, microwave ovens, vacuum cleaners, telephones and cellular phones, stereos, and VCRs and DVDs just about anything that has a cord, light or takes some kind of battery.

Recycling a computer is made easier by a few of the national services, such as Dell and Apple. Both companies will take back the computer of their make or any other make. Otherwise a computer can be donated to Computer Aid International which is an organization that recycles and refurbishes old computers for hospitals, schools, universities, etc.

See also

 Computer architecture
 Electronic hardware
 Hardware for artificial intelligence
 Glossary of computer hardware terms
 History of computing hardware
 Microprocessor
 MOSFET
 List of computer hardware manufacturers
 Open-source computing hardware
 Open-source hardware
 Transistor

References

External links
 
 
 

 
Digital electronics